Bríet Ísis Elfar (born 22 March 1999), known mononymously as Bríet, is an Icelandic singer known for her songs "Esjan", "Feimin(n)", and "Rólegur kúreki". Her album Kveðja, Bríet was selected as the album of the year at the 2021 Icelandic Music Awards.

Early life 

Bríet was born in Reykjavík and studied at Menntaskólinn við Hamrahlíð. She began performing at off-venue concerts at Iceland Airwaves at the age of 15 in addition to singing at jazz bars. She also participated in Iceland Got Talent.

Career 
Bríet sings in Icelandic and English and writes her songs in collaboration with Pálmi Ragnar Ásgeirsson, who is a member of the music production team StopWaitGo. Her first single, "In Too Deep", came out in 2018. She performed "Feimin(n)" with Aron Can.

Her album Kveðja, Bríet came out in 2020. The music is a mix of Scandinavian pop music and country music. Break-ups are the main theme of the album and Bríet received praise for her lyrical talent. Kveðja, Bríet was Rás 2's Album of the Week for a week in October and eight songs from the album made it to Spotify's Top 10 list for Iceland.

Albums 

 22.03.99 (EP, 2018)
Kveðja, Bríet (2020)

Awards and nominations

Personal life 
Bríet began a relationship with the lead guitarist of Kaleo in 2020.

Notes

References 

Living people
1999 births
21st-century Icelandic women singers